In coordination chemistry, metal ammine complexes are metal complexes containing at least one ammonia ligand. "Ammine" is spelled this way due to historical reasons; in contrast, alkyl or aryl bearing ligands are spelt with a single "m". Almost all metal ions bind ammonia as a ligand, but the most prevalent examples of ammine complexes are for Cr(III), Co(III), Ni(II), Cu(II) as well as several platinum group metals.

History

Ammine complexes played a major role in the development of coordination chemistry, specifically determination of the stereochemistry and structure. They are easily prepared, and the metal-nitrogen ratio can be determined by elemental analysis. Through studies mainly on the ammine complexes, Alfred Werner developed his Nobel Prize-winning concept of the structure of coordination compounds (see Figure).

One of the first ammine complexes to be described was Magnus' green salt, which consists of the platinum tetrammine complex .

Structure and bonding
Ammonia is a Lewis base and a "pure" sigma donor. It is also compact such that steric effects are negligible. These factors simplify interpretation of structural and spectroscopic results.The Co–N distances in complexes  have been examined closely by X-ray crystallography.

Examples
Homoleptic poly(ammine) complexes are known for many of the transition metals. Most often, they have the formula  where n = 2, 3, and even 4 (M = Pt).

Platinum group metals
Platinum group metals form diverse ammine complexes. Pentaamine(dinitrogen)ruthenium(II) and the Creutz–Taube complex are well-studied examples of historic significance. The complex cis-, under the name Cisplatin, is an important anticancer drug. Pentamminerhodium chloride is an intermediate in the purification of rhodium from its ores.

Cobalt(III) and chromium(III)
The ammines of chromium(III) and cobalt(III) are of historic significance. Both families of ammines are relatively inert kinetically, which allows the separation of isomers. For example, tetraamminedichlorochromium(III) chloride, has two forms - the cis isomer is violet, while the trans isomer is green. The trichloride of the hexaammine (hexamminecobalt(III) chloride) exists as only a single isomer. "Reinecke's salt" with the formula  was first reported in 1863.

Nickel(II), zinc(II), copper(II)

Zinc(II) forms a colorless tetraammine with the formula . Like most zinc complexes, it has a tetrahedral structure. Hexaamminenickel is violet, and the copper(II) complex is deep blue. The latter is characteristic of the presence of copper(II) in qualitative inorganic analysis.

Copper(I), silver(I), and gold(I)
Copper(I) forms only labile complexes with ammonia, including the trigonal planar [Cu(NH3)3]+. Silver gives the diammine complex [Ag(NH3)2]+ with linear coordination geometry. It is this complex that forms when otherwise rather insoluble silver chloride dissolves in aqueous ammonia. The same complex is the active ingredient in Tollens' reagent. Gold(I) chloride reacts with ammonia to form .

Reactions

Ligand exchange and redox reactions
Since ammonia is a stronger ligand in the spectrochemical series than water, metal ammine complexes are stabilized relative to the corresponding aquo complexes. For similar reasons, metal ammine complexes are less strongly oxidizing than are the corresponding aquo complexes.

Acid-base reactions
Once complexed to a metal ion, ammonia is no longer basic. This property is illustrated by the stability of some metal ammine complexes in strong acid solutions. When the M– bond is weak, the ammine ligand dissociates and protonation ensues.

The ammine ligands are more acidic than is ammonia (pKa ~ 33). The deprotonation of cobalt(III) ammine-halide complexes, e.g.  labilises the Co–Cl bond, according to the Sn1CB mechanism.

Oxidation of ammonia
Deprotonation can be combined with oxidation, allowing the conversion of ammine complexes into nitrosyl complexes:

H-atom transfer
In some ammine complexes, the N–H bond is weak. Thus one tungsten ammine complex evolve hydrogen:

This behavior is relevant to the use of ammonia as a hydrogen source.

Applications
Metal ammine complexes find many uses. Cisplatin (cis-) is a drug used in treating cancer. Many other amine complexes of the platinum group metals have been evaluated for this application.

In the processing of cellulose, the copper ammine complex known as Schweizer's reagent is sometimes used to solubilise the polymer. Schweizer's reagent is prepared by treating an aqueous solutions of copper(II) ions with ammonia. Initially, the light blue hydroxide precipitates only to redissolve upon addition of more ammonia:

Silver diammine fluoride is a topical medicament (drug) used to treat and prevent dental caries (cavities) and relieve dentinal hypersensitivity.

See also
 Ligand field theory

References